Judith Stamper (born 1952) is an English former television presenter, journalist and academic.

Early life
Stamper was born in Cockermouth, Cumberland. She attended Cockermouth Grammar School (now Cockermouth School). She graduated in English in 1975 from St David's University College, Lampeter (now the University of Wales, Trinity Saint David in 2010). She gained a postgraduate diploma in Journalism from University College, Cardiff.

Career
Stamper first worked for The Cumberland News for six weeks, and afterwards worked for three months in Carlisle (BBC Radio Cumbria) then for seven months in Liverpool (BBC Radio Merseyside). She became a researcher and then worked on BBC2's The Money Programme.

Television
In the BBC Yorkshire region she became known as the main presenter of Look North, with such colleagues as Harry Gration. She presented Look North from 1985 to 1995, joining in 1980. Sophie Raworth succeeded her at Look North (her first main television broadcasting position, and stayed for two years). The Look North editor was Martin Brooks.

Academic
Stamper is Deputy Head of Department and Principal Teaching Fellow in International  Journalism in the Institute of Communications and Media Studies at the University of Leeds.

Personal life
Stamper married in June 1987; her husband is an architect. The couple have a daughter (born 1988). She likes cordon bleu cookery. In the late 1980s, she lived in Ilkley.

References

External links
 University of Leeds
 TV Ark

1952 births
Living people
Academics of the University of Leeds
Alumni of Cardiff University
Alumni of the University of Wales, Lampeter
BBC newsreaders and journalists
English television presenters
People from Cockermouth
People from Ilkley
Television personalities from West Yorkshire